A special election for Negros Occidental's 5th district seat in the House of Representatives of the Philippines was on June 2, 2012. The special election was called after incumbent representative Iggy Arroyo died on January 26, 2012. Binalbagan Mayor Alejandro Mirasol defeated Negros Occidental Provincial Board Member Emilio Yulo III in the election.

Background

Iggy Arroyo, brother-in-law of Pampanga representative and former President Gloria Macapagal Arroyo, was in his third and final term as representative of Negros Occidental's 5th district when he died on January 26, 2012, in London.

A House resolution was filed declaring the seat vacant to pave the way for a special election, although Speaker Feliciano Belmonte, Jr. and Negros Occidental Commission on Elections supervisor Jessie Suarez expressed reservations since the 2013 elections were just more than a year away. Belmonte instead suggested of appointing a caretaker to attend to the projects in the district; representatives from the neighboring districts, Mercedes Alvarez (6th) and Jeffrey Ferrer (4th), expressed interest in serving as caretaker until a new representative has been elected. Provincial governor Alfredo Marañon also expressed reservations in continuing with the special election, while Negros Occidental Provincial Board Member Melvin Ibañez had expressed interest in contesting the seat if an election would be held.

On February 29, Belmonte, together with Negros Occidental representatives Alfredo Marañon III, Albee Benitez, Mercedes Alvarez and Julio Ledesma IV, filed a House resolution calling for a special election. On March 14, the House of Representatives passed the resolution approving the special election; the commission would have to schedule the date of the election. Possible candidates that were running include Arroyo's sister Marilou Arroyo-Lesaca (former representative of Ang Kasangga party-list), Binalbagan Mayor Alejandro Mirasol and Board Member Emilio Yulo III. The next night, the commission scheduled the special election on June 9. Benitez also announced that the United Negros Alliance (UNA), the province's dominant political party, will decide on who will they nominate for the vacant seat, with Benitez adding that the ruling Liberal Party has yet to state its preference among local politicians.

Election lawyer Romulo Macalintal said that the commission would just waste money on the special election, saying that money could have been better spent on basic services in the district. The Parish Pastoral Council for Responsible Voting (PPCRV) described the decision of holding the special election as "highly unconscionable" and a "total waste", stating that four months after election day, the filing of candidacies for the 2013 election would have had begun.

Campaign
The UNA meeting on March 24 ended in a stalemate as Mirasol and Yulo, his nephew, disagreed on how the nomination process will be conducted; Yulo wanted a ballot where the choice would be ticked, while Mirasol wanted a ballot where one has to write the name of the preferred nominee. There were also allegations of "grease money" distributed prior to the convention that led to Yulo calling off the convention.

On March 27, Arroyo-Lesaca announced that she will not contest the election, while the UNA would meet anew to decide on who among Mirasol and Ibañez will be their nominee; Mirasol is the frontrunner after being perceived to be the candidate by the Benigno Aquino III's administration. Later that week, Ibañez withdrew from the contest in favor of Mirasol; the latter is now seen as UNA's presumptive nominee. If Mirasol is not nominated by UNA, Grace Ibuna, Arroyo's longtime partner, will run. Other prospective candidates include former board member Enrique Montilla, a nephew of Arroyo-Lesaca, and former Isabela mayor Renato Malabor.

On a resolution dated March 28, the commission set the election on June 2, with a budget of more than 21 million pesos.

In a UNA caucus in Bacolod on April, it was decided that Mirasol would be their nominee for the special election. The governor, vice governor, the five other representatives, and all mayors in the 5th district gave their support to Mirasol. Only Himamaylan Mayor Agustin Ernesto Bascon, who was not present at the caucus, did not support Mirasol, instead endorsing Yulo. Ibuna expressed joy in Mirasol's nomination and will support him. Benitez also recruited Mirasol, a member of the Nationalist People's Coalition (NPC) to the Liberal Party, although he said that the Liberals will support Mirasol even though he would not join them.

Yulo said that he would not withdraw from the election. This comes as Yulo allegedly gave way to Arroyo in the 2010 election after being talked to by Mirasol. Yulo denied that Benitez was offering him to be included in 1DSWD's nominees in the 2013 party-list election to give way for Mirasol, and that he was not interested if ever he was offered. He admitted that while he won't match the financial resources of UNA and he only has the support of his cousin Mayor Bascon, he is not intimidated.

On April 20, Macalintal and fellow lawyer Antonio Carlos Bautista questioned the legality of the special election "because it will be held beyond the period as provided for by law." They argued that since Arroyo died on January 25, and that a special election "shall be called and held not earlier than 60 days nor longer than 90 days after the occurrence of the vacancy," the period of time when the election can be held is between March 25 and April 25.

Mirasol defected to the Liberal Party of President Aquino on May 5, along with his vice mayor and councilors, although he remained as a UNA member. As a result, Mirasol, who had previously been a Liberal in 1988 but joined the NPC after the Liberals disappeared from the province, got the endorsement of President Aquino. Former Las Piñas Representative Cynthia Villar, wife of Nacionalista party president and senator Manny Villar, announced they are supporting Yulo's candidacy.

The two candidates submitted their certificates of candidacies on May 16; Yulo went to the provincial elections office in the morning accompanied by his family, including Himamaylan mayor Bascon, where they handed out lollipops, while Mirasol submitted his certificate on the afternoon with the UNA officials. The two filed leaves of absence from their posts until the election period is over. In order to counter Mirasol's logistical advantage, Yulo will rely on his "lollipop campaign," where he distributes lollipops on the campaign trail, which had worked for him in previous elections.

Mirasol and Yulo signed a peace covenant pledging a peaceful election and denouncing the use of violence. The local government also promised that the police and military will be neutral in the election. On the eve of the election, both campaigns predicted victory; Governor Marañon hosted a rally at the Valeriano Gatuslao gym in Himamaylan for Mirasol, while Yulo ended the campaign on the road.

Results

Per municipality

The provincial board of canvassers declared Mirasol as the winner at 6:45 a.m. of June 3 at the Provincial Capitol in Bacolod. Commission on Elections chairman Sixto Brillantes, who had supervised the election, said that the election "was very peaceful, quiet and orderly. The weather did not cooperate but we still had a very good voters turnout at 73.41 percent." Mirasol won in Binalbagan, Isabela and La Castellana.

Aftermath 
Mirasol again defeated Yulo in the 2013 general election, and in 2016. In 2019, Marilou Arroyo-Lesaca, Iggy's sister, was elected unopposed. Arroyo-Lesaca was then defeated in 2022 by Yulo.

2010 election result

References

External links
COMELEC Resolution No. 9400

2012 elections in the Philippines
Special elections to the Congress of the Philippines
Politics of Negros Occidental